"All Night Long " is a song by American R&B singer Faith Evans featuring guest vocals by Puff Daddy. It was written by Evans, Sean "Puff Daddy" Combs, Ron "Amen-Ra" Lawrence, Schon Crawford, Clarence Emery, Todd Russaw, and Todd Gaither for her second album Keep the Faith (1998), while production was helmed by Lawrence, Combs, and Evans. The song contains a sample from "I Hear Music in the Streets" (1980) by American post-disco group Unlimited Touch. Due to the inclusion of the sample, Bertram Reed and Galen Underwood are also credited as songwriters.

The song was released by Bad Boy Records as the album's second single in March 1999. It reached number 9 on the US Billboard Hot 100 and number 3 on the Hot R&B/Hip-Hop Songs chart, becoming the second top ten single from Keep the Faith. An accompanying music video was directed by Paul Hunter.

Critical reception
Chuck Taylor from Billboard found that the "trips along with beautifully layered harmonies and a sensual, commanding vocal, all about finding the vibe and taking time to make it all feel right. It's wholly inviting, really, and an effortless add for contemporary radio." Allmusic editor Jose F. Promis felt that "All Night Long" was as "equally intoxicating" as previous single "Love Like This."

Music video
The music video for "All Night Long" was directed by Paul Hunter. It depicts Evans at a secret club event that is held inside a former airport terminal. Guest vocalist Puff Daddy appears alongside Evans in the videos. Tariq Nasheed makes a cameo appearance as a bodyguard.

Track listings

Credits and personnel 
Credits adapted from the liner notes of Keep the Faith.

 Sean Combs – producer, writer
 Schon Crawford – arranger, writer
 Clarence Emery – writer
 Faith Evans – producer, vocals, writer
 Todd Gaither – writer
 Ron "Amen-Ra" Lawrence – producer, writer
 Tony Maserati – mixing
 Michael Patterson – additional edits

 Joe Perrera – recording
 Bertram Reid – writer (sample)
 Todd Russaw – writer
 Thom Russo – recording
 Tony Smalios – recording
 Galen Underwood – writer (sample)
 Mario Winans – overdubs

Charts

Weekly charts

Year-end charts

References

1998 songs
1999 singles
Faith Evans songs
Sean Combs songs
Bad Boy Records singles
Songs written by Faith Evans
Songs written by Sean Combs
Music videos directed by Paul Hunter (director)